"Waiting for a Train" is the ninth single by the Australian group Flash and the Pan. It is taken from the album Headlines and was their most successful single, reaching number seven on the UK Singles Chart in 1983.

The single version (alternatively known as "French Take") includes a different intro compared to the LP cut, lacks an entire verse and some of the chorus lyrics. There were also two period remixes, an extended and an instrumental version. The extended version was sometimes called "disco version" and exists in two different lengths (5:42 and 7:18).

In 1989, a new version of the song, remixed by Harry Schulz and Kaplan Kaye and titled "Waiting for a Train '89 (The Harrymeetskaplan Mix)", was released in the UK on Cha Cha Records.

UK single release 
The UK single was released on Easy Beat Records and distributed by Ensign Records Ltd. The UK 7" single consisted of an A-side edited version (4:06) with the B-side being the 12" Instrumental version (6:39). The UK single catalogue number was EASY 1.

Charts

References 

1983 singles
Flash and the Pan songs
Songs written by Harry Vanda
Songs written by George Young (rock musician)
Song recordings produced by Harry Vanda
Song recordings produced by George Young (rock musician)
1982 songs
Albert Productions singles
Songs about trains